Ornament is a periodical magazine that documents the history, art and craft of ancient, ethnic and contemporary jewelry and personal adornment. It presents and discusses a wide range of personal adornment and wearable art, including beads, jewelry, and clothing.

The periodical was founded by 
 and 
 in 1974 as 
The Bead Journal: A Quarterly Publication of Ancient and Ethnic Jewelry.  
Its focus was expanded and it was retitled 
Ornament : A Quarterly of Jewelry and Personal Adornment in 1978.  
Their son  began to work full-time for the magazine in 2005, and is now a co-editor.

Robert Liu is also the in-house photographer for Ornament.  His cover images have been described as "stunningly beautiful".

Ornament magazine sponsors and selects the winner for the Ornament Award for Excellence in Art to Wear, at the Philadelphia Museum of Art Craft Show.

The Founders
Robert K. Liu studied ethnology and ichthyology and is a jeweler and photographer. He has written and lectured extensively on history, jewelry, and photography.
He is the author of the books Collectible Beads: A Universal Aesthetic (1995) The Photography of Personal Adornment (2014) and Naval Ship Models of World War II (2021).

Carolyn L. E. Benesh was a respected scholar, lecturer, and writer, and a collector of contemporary jewelry. She was a frequent juror for Philadelphia Museum of Art Craft Show and the Smithsonian Craft Show and a president and board member of PBS's series Craft in America. Benesh died on September 30, 2020. An exhibition spotlighting one hundred items from her collection, The Process of Becoming: The Jewelry Collection of Carolyn L.E. Benesh, appeared at the Wayne Art Center in December 2021. It was curated by Carol Sauvion and Emily Zaiden.

References

External links 
 Official website for Ornament
 Craft in America JEWELRY: Season 13 Episode 2, PBS

Visual arts magazines published in the United States
Magazines established in 1974
Jewellery
Wearable art
Arts and crafts magazines
Arts and Crafts movement